Traboe (pronounced tray-bow) is a hamlet on the Lizard Peninsula, Cornwall, England, United Kingdom. Traboe is about 5 km west of St Keverne; nearby is Traboe Cross, a junction on the B3293 road. It is approximately a mile down the road from Goonhilly Satellite Earth Station. It contains eleven houses and a building which used to house Rosuick Farm Shop, this being the purpose for which it was built. The list of houses includes a converted inn and a converted school house.

There is a well situated at the back of the green. A tree was planted on the green by residents of the hamlet to commemorate the millennium.

Traboe lies within the Cornwall Area of Outstanding Natural Beauty (AONB).

The name Traboe is a contraction of the Cornish language Treworabo, which contains the elements tre, meaning 'farm' or 'settlement', and Gworabo, a personal name.

References

 

Hamlets in Cornwall
St Keverne